The 1824 United States presidential election in Alabama took place between October 26 and December 2, 1824, as part of the 1824 presidential election. Voters chose five representatives, or electors, to the Electoral College, who voted for President and Vice President.

During this election, the Democratic-Republican Party was the only major national party, and four different candidates from this party sought the Presidency. Alabama voted for Andrew Jackson over John Quincy Adams, William H. Crawford and Henry Clay. Jackson won Alabama by a margin of 51.52%.

Results

See also
United States presidential elections in Alabama

References

Alabama
1824
1824 Alabama elections